Constellation is an album by saxophonist Sonny Stitt recorded in 1972 and released on the Cobblestone label.

Reception

Scott Yanow of AllMusic called the album "one of Sonny Stitt's greatest recordings. The bop master is stunning on most of the eight selections... switching between alto and tenor and sounding quite creative... this set has more than its share of great moments".

Track listing 
 "Constellation" (Charlie Parker) – 5:00  
 "I Don't Stand a Ghost of a Chance with You" (Bing Crosby, Ned Washington, Victor Young) – 4:46  
 "Webb City" (Bud Powell) – 3:30  
 "By Accident" (Sonny Stitt) – 6:42  
 "Ray's Idea" (Ray Brown, Gil Fuller) – 3:53  
 "Casbah" (Tadd Dameron) – 5:02  
 "It's Magic" (Sammy Cahn, Jule Styne) – 5:11  
 "Topsy" (Edgar Battle, Eddie Durham) – 5:35

Personnel 
Sonny Stitt – alto saxophone, tenor saxophone
Barry Harris – piano
Sam Jones – bass 
Roy Brooks – drums

References 

1972 albums
Cobblestone Records albums
Sonny Stitt albums
Albums produced by Don Schlitten